Sidekick is a Canadian animated series created by Todd Kauffman and Joey So for YTV, and produced by Nelvana. The series ran from September 3, 2010 to September 14, 2013 with 52 episodes produced. The series is based on the original shorts originally titled The Not-So-Superheroic Adventures of Sidekick aired as part of the 2005 TV series, Funpak. It currently airs reruns on YTV, Cartoon Network, and Disney XD in Canada.

Premise
The series is about an orphan boy named Eric, with his best friend Trevor and his two female friends, Vana and Kitty, who are training to become superhero sidekicks at the Academy for Aspiring Sidekicks (though in "Graduation Daze", supervillains can send their henchmen to the academy) in the Canadian city of Splittsboro (based on Scarborough, Toronto). While dealing with intense sidekick training, Eric must also contend with his strict guardian Maxum Brain, his grumpy teacher Professor Pamplemoose, the evil Master XOX and keeping secret the disappearance of his superhero mentor Maxum Man from the city!

Episodes

Characters

Main
 Eric Needles (Miklos Perlus) - Eric is a boy who was adopted as the sidekick to Maxum Man, the greatest superhero of all time (before he disappeared). He also has a huge crush on Vana, but he later seems to be more infatuated with Mandy Struction. He grew up in an orphanage because he has no known parents, although in the Funpak short: The Evil Trevor, Eric says that he once had a dad who spit on his face all the time, until he died. He was adopted by Maxum Brain. Eric always wears a T-shirt with a skull on it (hinting at what Todd Kauffman would make after Sidekick ended production). He and Trevor always get into trouble and they don't have common sense. He and his friends are often forced to clean up the messes they caused. In the Funpak shorts, he was voiced by Peter Oldring. With Maxum Man missing, Eric must do all his heroic duties to ensure the public is safe and make them think he still on the job but unfortunately, he has no powers nor hero experience to fight the villainous threats Maxum Man faces. Luckily, he has friends to help him out and gives him good and solid advice on how to handle these kinds of situations.
 Trevor Troublemeyer (Christian Potenza) - Eric's best friend. Trevor always ropes Eric into all sorts of hijinks. His father is Master XOX but he, and the others are all completely unaware of this. Like Eric, he knows that Maxum Man is missing and helps him keep it secret from the public or risk mass panic if they ever find out. He went to Sidekick Academy in order to become a henchman of his father.
 Kitty Ko (Denise Oliver) - Kitty is a girl who, despite being a bit strange, gives the rest of the group advice, and is somewhat a good hacker and fixer. She has a huge crush on Eric and has a bit of a stalker-like obsession towards him. She literally had a condition of two left feet as revealed in "Trip Van Twinkle Toes" and like Eric, she is an orphan as revealed in "Parent Teacher Night of Doom". In the Funpak shorts, she was voiced by Stephanie Beard. Unlike Eric and Trevor, she is unaware that Maxum Man is missing and is shocked and terrified at the thought of it.
 Vana Glama (Stephanie Anne Mills) - Vana is a hyper-ambitious prima donna who is not easily impressed and is extremely shallow. She often tortures Eric and hates him for no apparent reason (although she is not aware of it). Despite this, Eric has a huge crush on her, often oblivious to her selfish, snobby, and more-often-than-not sour-hearted character. In the Funpak shorts, she was also voiced by Stephanie Beard. Like Kitty, she is also unaware Maxum Man is missing and also shocked and terrified at the thought of it.
 Maxum Brain (Tony Daniels) - Eric's guardian due to the fact that Maxum Man is missing. He is a computer with many gadgets and acted as Maxum Man's assistant before his disappearance. He is strict about following rules, keeping the mansion clean and speaks with an East Indian accent.
 Maxum Man (Ron Pardo) - Eric's favorite superhero, before Eric became his current sidekick, with Superman-like powers. After he went missing, Eric and Maxum Brain do everything for him to make it seem like he never left. It seems that Maxum Man always makes his own enemies purely by accident.

Recurring
 Mr. Martin Troublemeyer/Master XOX (Scott McCord/Ron Rubin) - Trevor's father. All he wants is what is best for Trevor and for him to be a good boy, which is why Trevor can't stand him. He tries to stay calm because of his short temper. The only time Trevor likes him is when he gets angry. However, when Trevor is not looking, his dad becomes the creepy, deformed super villain known as Master XOX, the main antagonist of the series.
 Professor Pamplemoose (Patrick McKenna) - The cruel Headmaster at the Sidekick Academy and Eric's grumpy teacher, Pampelmoose is a strict disciplinarian who runs the school like it was prison camp. He has devoted his life to turning worthless students into worthless Sidekicks. He often punishes Eric for obvious reasons, resulting him getting sent to detention.
 Golly Gee Kid (Ron Pederson) - Golly Gee Kid was Maxum Man's sidekick in the old days, often seen in Maxum Man's Sidekick Academy training films. While a sidekick, it seemed that his primary job was to perform chores around the mansion. He is now the school's janitor.
 Mandy Struction (Stacey DePass) - A teenage student at the henchman school (though she would later become an anti-hero in later episodes) and Eric's new crush. She has seismic boots that can cause tremors in the floor whenever she stomps down. She is much taller than the other kids, suggesting she might be older than them. She also has a crush on Eric, which is why Kitty (used to) hate her. She appeared in the episodes "Match Dot Com", "Henchman for a Day", "Mandy-O and Eric-Et", "Oh Trevor, Where Art Thou?" and "Walter Ego Presents: Vapo House".
 Allan Amazing (Scott McCord) - Allan is a handsome student who is popular with the female students. Although he acts nice and sensible, he has an immense hatred for Eric and is a narcissist who will do anything to best anyone, especially Eric. He is interested in Vana as well and is of Hispanic origin. 
 Kid Ruthless (Carter Hayden) - A big tough student who seems to be a bully, as he tortures Eric for stealing his Sidekick Identity Name. He was popular with the students for his music. He was nice to Eric after the latter defeated him in a DJ Battle. He appeared in the episodes "Identity Crisis" and "Drop The Needles".
 Mayor Swifty (John Stocker) - The Senior Mayor of Splittsboro, all he wants to do is to see Maxum Man, which happened once in "Ain't No Party Like a Maxum Brain Party". He also initially has a hatred for a temporarily fired Super Hero, Static Clint, as shown in "The Spark is Gone", though it seems to have disappeared after this episode. Swifty also appeared in the episode "The Maxum Switcheroo".
 Maxum Mom (Ellen Ray Hennessy) - Maxum Man's mother, who has an intense dislike for Master XOX. She is tough like her son, and has visited and cared for Eric a couple of times in the Maxum Mansion. She has appeared in the episodes "Maxum Mom", "Shopping Spree", and "Family Fun Day". Eric posed as her in the episode "The Maxum Switcheroo" to expose the fake Maxum Man.
 Maxum Mel (Ron Pardo) - Maxum Man's older brother. He is tough like his brother and visited the Maxum Mansion one time. He has a sidekick named Mouse Boy.
 Joshua Sideburns (Fab Filippo) - A movie star with whom Kitty is obsessed. He visits Splittsboro to act in upcoming movies. He appeared in the episodes "Comic Book Zombies", "Teenage Mummies in Love" and "Maxum Method".
 Opossum Man (Tony Daniels) - Another Superhero in Splittsboro who is a parody of Batman and always wants to make crime and criminals play dead like real opossums do. He also has a sidekick named Boy Vermin. He appears in "Opposum Man".
 Glenn/Boy Vermin (Deven Mack) - Eric's old friend from the orphanage and Opossum Man's sidekick dressed as a rodent who is a parody of Robin and always assists Opossum Man. His real name is Glenn. He appears in "Opposum Man".

Broadcast
In the United States, the series premiered on Cartoon Network alongside Almost Naked Animals on June 13, 2011 until October 2012. The series also aired on Qubo from March 27, 2017 until August 24, 2019. However, it returned on April 4, 2020, but left the schedule once again on July 25, 2020.

In Australia and New Zealand, the series premiered on ABC3, later also on Network Ten on November 23, 2011 and later Disney XD on April 9, 2015.

In the UK and Ireland, the series premiered on CBBC on September 1, 2014.

It currently airs reruns on YTV, Cartoon Network, and Disney XD in Canada.

In Italy, it ran from 2011 to 2014 on the digital terrestrial television channel K2.

In Portugal, it premiered in 2019  on the digital terrestrial television channel SIC K.

The series is streaming on Pluto TV and Tubi.

References

External links
 

2010 Canadian television series debuts
2013 Canadian television series endings
2010s Canadian animated television series
2010s Canadian comic science fiction television series
Canadian children's animated action television series
Canadian children's animated adventure television series
Canadian children's animated comic science fiction television series
Canadian children's animated science fantasy television series
Canadian children's animated superhero television series
Canadian superhero comedy television series
English-language television shows
YTV (Canadian TV channel) original programming
Superhero schools
Television series by Nelvana
Animated television series about orphans
Television shows set in Ontario
Television shows set in Toronto